Simon Maisuradze (born 14 September 1986) is a Georgian rugby union player. His position is hooker, and he currently plays for La Voulte-Valence in the French Fédérale 1 and the Georgia national team.

References

Rugby union players from Georgia (country)
Georgia international rugby union players
Living people
1986 births
Rugby union hookers
Rugby union players from Tbilisi